Mikhail Aleksandrovich Samarsky (born 15 August 1996, Rostov-on-Don) is a Russian writer, blogger and public figure. He is an honorary member of the Union of Russian-speaking writers of Bulgaria and president of the charitable foundation "Living Hearts" («Живые сердца»)

Biography
Samarsky was born on 15 August 1996 in Rostov-on-Don and has lived in Moscow since 1997. He studied at Moscow's School No. 1084 from 2003 to 2007 and at School No. 1239 from 2007 to 2012. From 2012 to 2013, he studied at the School of External Studies No. 1, which is affiliated with Moscow State University. In 2013, he was admitted to the Department of Political Science of Moscow State University.

At the same time, he graduated from the Faculty of Military Education of Moscow State University and was sent to the recruitment office and enlistment office of Moscow for military training in the 4th Guards Kantemirovskaya Tank Division.

In 2017, after graduating from Moscow State University he entered Gerasimov Institute of Cinematography at the Higher Courses of Cinema and Television according to the program “Cinema Direction and Screen Writing”.

Since 23 August 2018, Mikhail works as an actor at “Theater Orbit” studio; he debuted at the Tyumen Drama Theater.

Family 
Samarsky's father, Alexander Vasilyevich Samarsky (born 1959), is a playwright, script writer and poet. His mother, Anna Mikhailovna Samarskaya (maiden name Amelina) (born 1971), author of detective novels published under the pseudonym Anna Arkan, chairman of the board of the charity fund to help blind people «Living hearts»

Literary activity 

Samarsky, at the age of twelve, wrote his first novella, "On a Teeterboard Between the Hills,” which, upon its publication the following year, received coverage by the mass media. Yekaterina Bosina, writing in "Ogonyok" magazine, wrote that there are no "substantial revelations" for adult readers, but "from the language perspective the book isn't "Baby talk" at all, the absence of which "gives Misha Samarsky an edge over the majority of his peers." Samarsky, thus encouraged, continued his literary activity. He published a novel, "A Rainbow for a Friend,” which became the first in a four-book series. (Moreover, the "Eksmo" publishing house has published the books under the theme, "The Adventures of an Extraordinary Dog.") An article published in the magazine Neva in the summer of 2013 referred to Samarsky as "a young prose writer well known by the greater [Russian] public.

Public activity and charitable work 

Samarsky began his engagement in charitable activities in 2010, when he founded an informal program, "Living Hearts,” through which, with the help of friends and acquaintances, he was able to assist blind children. He published audio books, Braille-font books, etc., and purchased equipment for blind and visually impaired children. Russian entrepreneurs, politicians and actors provided assistance in the operation of the program. Businessman Andrei Ryabinsky proposed that it be registered as an official charity fund for the blind under the "Living Hearts" name. Thus, on October 12, 2012 the charity fund "Living Hearts" was founded on the basis of the program. Anna Mikhailovna Samarskaya, Mikhail's mother, is a co-founder and the chairperson of the fund.

On 9 November 2011, during the meeting with Russia's President Dmitry Medvedev and Russian bloggers, Samarsky raised the issue of Internet accessibility for visually impaired people. He stated that the Braille displays for computers are out of reach for the majority of visually impaired people because they're expensive and the displays, which are provided to children for use in their studies, must be returned after graduation. The issue received further development, and President Medved'yev recommended an amendment to the legislation to allow a child to keep the technical equipment after graduation.

Bibliography 
Editions in Russian language
 
 
 
 
 
 
 
 
 
 
 
 
 
 
 
 
 

EBooks
 
 
 
 
 
 
 
 

Editions in other languages
  (English)
  (Vietnamese)
  (Vietnamese)
  (Bulgarian)

Audiobooks
 
 
 
 
 

Braille Books
 
 

Scientific work

Picturizations and plays 

On 13 October 2012, the premier of the play "I'm a Dog" took place at the "Samarskaya Ploschad'” theater (under director E. B. Drobyshev) based on the novel "A Rainbow for a Friend". Six months later, Mrs. Natalia Nosova, the theater director, acknowledged the project as successful. The "Samarskaya Ploschad'" theater for the play "I'm a Dog" was thus awarded a special prize "For a Socially Important Project" and the Governor's Award, "Theatrical Muse of Samarsk-2012".

In 2012 a documentary film on the lives of blind people, titled "Living Hearts,” was shot with the participation of Mikhail Samarsky.

In August 2018, a theatrical rendition of "Rainbow for a Friend" premiered at the Tyumen Drama Theatre. The role of Labrador Trison was played by Samarsky himself.

In November 2018, there was a premiere of the play “Rainbow for a Friend” at the Bulgakov Theatre in Moscow.

Awards 
Samarsky has been awarded the following awards for the play "A Rainbow for a Friend":
 Diploma of the Laureate of Lomonosov, "Talents and Abilities" category, 2009;
 Golden Diploma named after Iosif Alexandrovich Brodsky;
 The grand prize in the multigenre literary contest "Slon,” 2009.
 The special prize of the jury of the Moscow Open Festival of Small Forms Performances for Children “Fairy World” for the text to the play “I Am a Dog” (2013).
 The project of Mikhail Samarsky's “Insight of the Soul - Living Hearts” won second place in the “Equal” nomination at the contest “Our Moscow Region” (2014).
 In 2015, the project of  Samarsky, Maria Shepotinenko and Nikolai Ektov, “Formation of the national-state identity of Moscow schoolchildren” became the winner of the All-Russian creative competition of research works, social projects and programs to foster civic identity among students.

References

External links 
  
 
 
 
 
 

1996 births
Russian male novelists
Russian bloggers
21st-century Russian writers
Living people
Male bloggers
Moscow State University alumni
Russian political scientists
Russian activists
Russian male actors
Russian humanitarians